"Crossed" is the seventh episode of the fifth season of the post-apocalyptic horror television series The Walking Dead, which aired on AMC on November 23, 2014. It was written by Seth Hoffman and directed by Billy Gierhart. In the episode, Michonne and Carl Grimes stay at the barricaded Church with Gabriel Stokes as Rick Grimes and the others go on a rescue mission for Beth Greene and Carol Peletier in Atlanta. The episode received generally positive reviews, though most noted the set up for the mid-season finale. This is the first episode to feature all credited series regulars for the fifth season.

The episode title refers to Rosita Espinosa explaining how she met Abraham Ford and Eugene Porter, crossing paths in Dallas. It also refers to Sasha being double-crossed by Sgt. Bob Lamson.

Plot
Daryl returns to the church with Noah, informing the group of Beth and Carol's whereabouts. After some discussion, Rick, Daryl, Noah, Tyreese, and Sasha head to Atlanta. They fortify the church by hacking apart the pews and the church's pipe organ to board up the doors and windows and build outer defenses to provide protection for Michonne, Carl, Gabriel, and Judith. Carl gives Gabriel a machete and tries to teach him how to defend himself, but he is unwilling to learn. Troubled by the desecration of his church and the slaughter of the Terminus survivors, Gabriel secludes himself in his office, pries up the floor boards, and sneaks out under the floor boards where he immediately steps on a nail. Gabriel is attacked by a walker in the woods which he impales on a broken branch, but is unable to kill it after noticing it is wearing a cross on a chain.

At the hospital, Dawn is in a heated discussion with O'Donnell over their inability to find Noah. Beth listens in as the subject turns to Carol. O'Donnell feels that she is a lost cause, and keeping her alive is waste of resources. Beth intervenes, and an angry Dawn instructs O'Donnell to take Carol off life support. When O'Donnell leaves, Dawn chastises Beth for forcing her hand but gives her the key to the drug locker so she can save Carol. Dawn admits that she was wrong about Beth's perceived weakness. Beth later confronts Dr. Edwards and convinces him to tell her which drug to use to save Carol. Beth retrieves some epinephrine from the locker and administers it to Carol.

Meanwhile, Eugene is still unconscious and Abraham has become non-responsive. Glenn, Maggie, Tara, and Rosita debate whether or not they should return to the church. Glenn, Tara, and Rosita leave to find water, while Maggie stays behind to keep an eye on Eugene and Abraham. Eventually, Abraham speaks, claiming he still wants to live. Glenn, Tara, and Rosita return with water and fish as Eugene regains consciousness.

As Rick's group arrives in Atlanta, and Rick lays out a vague plan to infiltrate the hospital, capture Lerner and force the whole place to stand down. Tyreese feels that this is too risky and proposes they instead capture cops and make an exchange of prisoners; Daryl agrees with Tyreese, and Rick finds himself out-voted. Noah acts as bait and lures two officers, Sgt. Bob Lamson (Maximiliano Hernández) and Officer Shepherd, into an ambush, quickly capturing them. One of the officers, Lamson, realizes Rick was a cop. The two officers briefly escape when a third officer, Officer Licari (Christopher Matthew Cook), arrives as backup, but all three are ultimately recaptured.

Now in Rick's custody, the officers insist Dawn won't trade for them, as she doesn't like them anyway, but if released vow to oust Lerner and install Lamson in her place. Lamson, however, advises Rick that Lerner will start from a no-negotiating position but will compromise as she always does and ultimately make the trade. Meanwhile, Sasha is still distraught over Bob's death, and her interest is piqued when she discovers that Lamson's first name is also Bob. When Rick, Tyreese, and Daryl leave to make contact with Dawn, Sasha is left alone with the prisoners and Lamson tells her a heart-rending story how his partner, who was killed in the bombings, has come back as a walker, but he never had a chance to put him out of his misery. Sasha offers to help Lamson put his partner to rest (and get her own closure) and Lamson guides her to a location from which she can shoot. However, when she takes aim, Lamson tackles Sasha and knocks her out, then flees.

Production
The melted walkers in Atlanta's streets were a combination of dummies and half-buried actors. The cast was unaware that some of them were real until they started moving. The walker's head that Daryl ripped off was rigged so that the spine would move afterward. There were finger controls for the spine inside of the eye sockets.

Reception
Upon airing, the episode was watched by 13.33 million American viewers with an 18-49 rating of 7.0, a decrease in viewership from the previous week which had 14.07 million viewers and an 18-49 rating of 7.3.

In Australia, it received 0.101 million viewers, making it the highest-rated cable broadcast that day.

The episode received generally positive reviews. Matt Fowler of IGN rated it 8.2 out of 10 saying that the episode "had some cool, intense moments". Tim Surette of TV.com, in a mixed review, wrote, "The penultimate episode of Season 5A, "Crossed" wasn't a bad episode, but it immediately jumps to the front of the line for the title of worst—no, wait, that sounds bad, so let's say "least good"—episode of Season 5 so far." However, the reviewer also stated that "the episode did appropriately set things up for The Walking Dead's winter finale." Zack Handlen, writing for The A.V. Club, gave the episode a "B+", stating that "in short, The Walking Dead has gotten better at balancing hope against despair."

In a mixed review, Sean McKenna of TV Fanatic wrote that "[the episode] was necessary to pull everything that’s come in The Walking Dead Season 5 back together towards its new central focus, its new central direction," while also stating that "I wasn't wowed by this episode, but it wasn't abysmal." Jeff Stone of Indiewire gave the episode a "B−". Alex Straker, writing for The Independent, wrote that " 'Crossed' is an episode that highlights the strengths and flaws of the fifth series."

References

External links

"Crossed" at AMC

2014 American television episodes
The Walking Dead (season 5) episodes